Copelatus mathani is a species of diving beetle. It is part of the genus Copelatus, which is in the subfamily Copelatinae of the family Dytiscidae. It was described by Félix Guignot in 1952.

References

mathani
Beetles described in 1952